The eighth and final competition weekend of the 2010–11 ISU Speed Skating World Cup was held in Heerenveen, Netherlands, from 4–6 March 2011.

Schedule of events
The time schedule of the event stands below:

Medal summary

Men's events

Women's events

References

8
Isu World Cup, 2010-11, 8
ISU Speed Skating World Cup, 2010-11, World Cup 8